AFAS may refer to:

 Advanced Field Artillery System, or XM2001 Crusader
 AFAS Software (:nl:AFAS Software)
 AFAS Stadion, a Dutch stadium